Stelpaviricetes is a class of non-enveloped, positive-strand RNA viruses which infect plants and animals. Characteristic of the group is a VPg protein attached to the 5'-end of the genome and a conserved 3C-like protease from the PA clan of proteases for processing the translated polyprotein. The name of the group is a syllabic abbreviation of member orders "stellavirales, patatavirales" with the suffix -viricetes denoting a virus class.

Orders

The following orders are recognized:

 Patatavirales
 Stellavirales

References

Viruses